Island hopping is a military strategy used in the Pacific during World War II

Island hopping may also refer to:
 Carnival Cruise Line Tycoon 2005: Island Hopping, a business simulation game
 Island Hopping, an early version of the board game Coin Hopping—Washington D.C.

See also
 Hop Island, an island of the Rauer Islands, Antarctica
 Stepping stone (disambiguation)